Egesina vitticollis is a species of beetle in the family Cerambycidae. It was described by Stephan von Breuning in 1943.

Subspecies
 Egesina vitticollis corporaali Breuning, 1958
 Egesina vitticollis vitticollis Breuning, 1943

References

Egesina
Beetles described in 1943